A Europhile is a person who is fond of, admires, or loves European culture, society, history, food, music etc.

See also

Eurocentrism
Anglophile
Francophile
Germanophile
Polonophile
Afrocentrism
Russophile

Notes

European culture
Admiration of foreign cultures
Pan-European nationalism